The  Eastern League season began on approximately April 1 and the regular season ended on approximately September 1. 

The New Britain Rock Cats and Reading Phillies advanced to the ELCS.  The teams were declared co-champions due to stoppage of play in professional baseball as a result of the September 11 attacks in the United States.

Regular season

Standings

Notes:
Green shade indicates that team advanced to the playoffs
Bold indicates that team advanced to ELCS
Italics indicates that New Britain and Reading were declared Eastern League co-champions

Statistical league leaders

Batting leaders

Pitching leaders

Playoffs

Divisional Series

Northern Division
The New Britain Rock Cats defeated the Norwich Navigators in the Northern Division playoffs 3 games to 1.

Southern Division
The Reading Phillies defeated the Erie SeaWolves in the Southern Division playoffs 3 games to 1.

Championship Series
The ELCS was not played in 2001 as a result of the September 11 attacks.  The New Britain Rock Cats and Reading Phillies were declared co-champions due to stoppage of play in professional baseball

References

External links
2001 Eastern League Review at thebaseballcube.com

Eastern League seasons